Virginia's 74th House of Delegates district elects one of the 100 members of the Virginia House of Delegates. District 74 includes part of Charles City County, part of Henrico County and part of the city of Richmond.

The seat has been held by Democrat Lamont Bagby since July, 2015.

District officeholders

References

Charles City County, Virginia
Government in Henrico County, Virginia
Richmond, Virginia
Virginia House of Delegates districts